Mindaugas Grigalevičius (born 3 December 1981) is a Lithuanian footballer playing for Frøya.

Grigalevičius has made two appearances for the Lithuania national football team.

References

External links

1981 births
Living people
Lithuanian footballers
Lithuanian expatriate footballers
Lithuania international footballers
FBK Kaunas footballers
FC Mika players
Expatriate footballers in Armenia
Place of birth missing (living people)
Grigalevičius
Armenian Premier League players

Association football forwards